Tyrannasorus rex is an extinct species of hybosorid beetle known to exist in the Miocene epoch and the sole member of the monotypic genus Tyrannasorus. A fossilized example scarabaeoid was found embedded in the amber resin of Hymenaea protera in the Dominican Republic. The species was described by Brett C. Ratcliffe and Federico Carlos Ocampo in 2001.

Holotype 
The observed specimen is assumed to be female based on similarities to the female specimens of the genus Apalonychus. She was trapped in the resin produced by Hymenaea protera, now also extinct. The amber was previously dated to Oligocene or Eocene, but these datings are since considered incorrect, and it is accepted that the amber was formed between late Early Miocene and Middle Miocene (15–20 million years ago). The amber came from Dominican Republic, probably from the mountain range north of Santiago de los Caballeros. It is too dark for ventral characteristics of the insect's body to be observed.

Description 
Unlike other hybosorids from the West Indies, whose antennae are 10-segmented, Tyrannasorus rex had nine-segmented antennae. The species is most similar to the genera Coilodes and Apalonychus; their shared characteristics include convex and not quite spherical body and reddish-brown colour. The most prominent difference between Coilodes and Tyrannasorus is in the shape of the antennal club, which is slightly concave in Tyrannasorus but cup-shaped in Coilodes. Furthermore, the former's labrum is wider than the latter's and, unlike the former's, the anterior margin of the latter's pronotum is sinuate. Species of the genus Apalonychus have a much more elongated club of the antenna compared to Tyrannasorus and, unlike Tyrannasorus, eyes of the specimen are subglose and easily visible in dorsal view. Their labrum is also wider than that of Tyrannasorus and the anterior margin of their pronotum is not sinuate. As with other insects, the beetle's six legs consisted of a pair of prolegs, a pair of middle legs and a pair of posterior legs. The insect's elytra have a smooth surface.

Etymology 
It was named after Tyrannosaurus rex, the dinosaur, although its discoverers provide an etymology for the name based on the word Hybosorus, the type genus of the family  Hybosoridae, to which the species belongs. The stem of the generic name is derived from the Latin tyrannus, meaning "master" or "tyrannical", while the suffix -sorus means "pile" or "hump" in Latin. The name, "tyrannical hump", ultimately refers to the mound of sap in which the observed specimen was fatally trapped.

References 

†
Prehistoric beetles
Prehistoric insects of the Caribbean
Miocene insects
Neogene Dominican Republic
Dominican amber
Fossils of the Dominican Republic
Fossil taxa described in 2001